Ihor Vitaliyovych Hrytsyuk (born 25 October 2002) is a Ukrainian professional footballer who plays as a defender for Ukrainian club Volyn Lutsk.

References

External links
 Profile on Volyn Lutsk official website
 

2002 births
Living people
Place of birth missing (living people)
Ukrainian footballers
Association football defenders
FC Volyn Lutsk players
Ukrainian Second League players